Paulo Sérgio Betti (born 8 September 1952) is a Brazilian actor, playwright, and stage director. He also works occasionally as film producer and director.

Biography
Paulo Sérgio Betti was born on 8 September  1952 in Rafard, a small town in the state of São Paulo. In over thirty years of career, Betti has acted in over 20 telenovelas and in 21 feature films. His most notable role was as the revolutionary Captain Carlos Lamarca in Lamarca (1994) and Zuzu Angel (2006), both directed by Sérgio Rezende. For his role in Lamarca, he won the São Paulo Association of Art Critics Award for Best Film Actor in 1995. He also hosted the show Novos Nomes em Cena of Canal Brasil, where he interviewed young Brazilian actors.

Betti was married to actress Eliane Giardini between 1973 and 1997. The couple had two daughters: Juliana (born in 1977) and Mariana (born in 1980). He was also married to actress Maria Ribeiro, mother of his only son João (born on 30 March 2003). The couple separated in 2005.

Political views
In 1989 Betti was one of the producers of the music video for the famous jingle "Lula Lá" ("Lula There") for the presidential candidate Luiz Inácio Lula da Silva from the Workers' Party. In this video, several famous artists of the time sing the jingle. Betti supported Lula throughout all of his presidential campaigns, including the one in 2006, when several artists withdrawn their support from the candidate because of his party's involvement in the scandal known as "mensalão".

On 1st October 2020 Betti stated that he wishes the death of all elderly people that walk in the streets without face masks, and lamented that President Jair Bolsonaro did not die when he was stabbed in 2018.

Filmography

As director
 2017 - A Fera na Selva
 2003 - Cafundó

As actor
 2023 - Amor Perfeito as Anselmo Evaristo
 2023 - The Masked Singer Brasil (season 3), cosplayed as coelho
 2022 - Além da Ilusão as Constantino Andrade / Valentino Estrella
 2019 - Órfãos da Terra as Miguel Nasser
 2018 - O Sétimo Guardião as Ypiranga Pitiguary
 2017 - O Outro Lado do Paraíso as Maurício
 2016 - Rock Story as Haroldo
 2016 - Chatô, o Rei do Brasil as Getúlio Vargas
 2014 - Império as Téo Pereira
 2013 - Casa da Mãe Joana 2 as Paulo Roberto
 2013 - Anita e Garibaldi as Luigi Rossetti (voice)
 2012 - Lado a Lado as Mário Cavalcanti
 2011 - A Vida da Gente as Jonas Macedo
 2008 - Casa da Mãe Joana as Paulo Roberto
 2007 - Sete Pecados as Flávio
 2007 - O Signo da Cidade as Teca's husband
 2007 - A Grande Família - O Filme as Carlinhos
 2007 - Paraíso Tropical as Lucena
 2006 - JK as José Maria Alkmin
 2006 - Zuzu Angel as Cap. Carlos Lamarca
 2006 - Tapete vermelho as Aparício
 2006 - Irma Vap - O Retorno
 2005 - Cafundó (also director) as Parrot man
 2003 - Kubanacan as Chacon
 2002 - Desejos de Mulher as Alex Miller
 2001 - O Clone as Armando
 2001 - Onde andará Petrúcio Felker (voice) (short subject)
 2000 - Os idiotas mesmo (voice) (short subject)
 2000 - Um Anjo Trapalhão
 1999 - Força de um Desejo as Higino Ventura
 1999 - Chiquinha Gonzaga as Antônio Carlos Gomes
 1999 - Oriundi as Renato Padovani
 1999 - Mauá - O Imperador e o Rei as Irineu Evangelista de Sousa, Viscount of Mauá
 1999 - O toque do oboé as Augusto
 1997 - A Indomada as Ypiranga Pitiguary
 1997 - O Amor Está no Ar as Bigode (Mustache)
 1997 - Ed Mort as Ed Mort
 1997 - Guerra de Canudos as Zé Lucena
 1996 - O Fim do Mundo as Joãozinho da Dagmar
 1996 - Quem Matou Pixote? as TV director
 1995 - A Próxima Vítima as Olavo
 1995 - Biu, a vida real não tem retake (short subject)
 1994 - Lamarca as Cap. Carlos Lamarca
 1993 - Mulheres de Areia as Wanderley Amaral
 1992 - Pedra sobre Pedra as Carlão Batista
 1991 - Olha! Isso pode dar bolo (short subject)
 1990 - Césio 137 - o Pesadelo de Goiânia 1989 - [[Tieta (TV series)|Tieta]] as Timóteo
 1989 - Doida Demais as Gabriel
 1988 - Dedé Mamata as Dedé's father
 1987 - Besame Mucho as César
 1985 - Fonte da Saudade
 1985 - Jogo Duro
 1984 - Vereda Tropical as Marco

References

External links

1952 births
Living people
Brazilian people of Italian descent
Brazilian male stage actors
Brazilian male film actors
Brazilian male telenovela actors
People from Capivari